Tina's Fissure is a cave in the British Overseas Territory of Gibraltar. Tina's Fissure, George's Bottom Cave and Levant Cave are a close group of three caves at the southern end of the Upper Rock Nature Reserve.

See also
List of caves in Gibraltar

References

Caves of Gibraltar